This is a list of airlines currently operating in Bosnia and Herzegovina.

Charter airlines

See also
List of defunct airlines of Bosnia and Herzegovina
List of airlines of Yugoslavia

References

Bosnia And Herzegovina

Airlines
Airlines
Bosnia and Herzgovina